The Suzuki M engine family is a line of automobile engines from Suzuki. Ranging in displacement from 1.3 L to 1.8 L, it is a modern engine line with dual overhead cams, 16 valves, and multi-point fuel injection (MPFI).

M13A
It has a 9.5:1 compression ratio and two variants:
 with variable valve timing (VVT) valvetrain
 without VVT (Suzuki Jimny, Suzuki Ignis, Suzuki Liana) in select markets.

 M13A —  VVT
 Suzuki Ignis (first generation)
 1999–2010 Wagon R Solio 1.3
 2000–2018 Suzuki Jimny Wide/Sierra
 Suzuki Swift (First generation)

M13AA
The M13AA is an automotive engine manufactured by Suzuki Motor Corporation. The M13AA is a  inline-4 cylinder 16 valve VVT engine used in the Suzuki Jimny from 2005 - cars manufactured in Spain, but 2001 for Japanese manufactured cars.

1.3 M13aa  DOHC 16v MPFI VVT (Jimny)
Bore x Stroke 
Compression Ratio 9.5:1
 @ 6000 rpm,  @ 4100 rpm

M15A

The M15A displaces ; bore is and stroke . This engine has a variable valve timing valvetrain.

(Ignis)
Compression Ratio 11.0:1
 @ 6400 rpm,  @ 4100 rpm

(Swift/SX4 )
Compression Ratio 9.5:1
 @ 5900 rpm,  @ 4100 rpm

(S-Cross - Indonesian Version)
Compression Ratio 10.3:1
 @ 6000 rpm,  @ 4400 rpm

Application:
 2001–2007 Suzuki Aerio/Liana/Baleno (North America)
 2001–2008 Suzuki Ignis/Ignis Sport  (first generation)
 2004–2010 Suzuki Swift - 2nd generation 
 2006–2013 Suzuki SX4
 2016–2022 Suzuki S-Cross (Indonesia)

M16A 
The M16A displaces . Bore is and stroke . This engine has a DOHC variable valve timing valve train and a multipoint injection system. The engine had many iterations, depending on the car in which it was installed and the intended use of the car. The M16A engine uses a chain cam instead of a cam belt.  
General dimensions:

1.6L (Liana)
2001–2004
compression ratio: 9.7:1
Maximum output:  @ 5,500 rpm
Maximum torque:  @ 4000 rpm

1.6L 
2004–2007
compression ratio:10.5:1
Maximum output:  @ 5,500 rpm
Maximum torque:  @ 4000 rpm

1.6L VVT
compression ratio: 11.1:1
Maximum output:  @ 5,600 rpm
Maximum torque:  @ 4400 rpm (2WD SX4); (4WD SX4)

1.6 M16a MPFI VVT (SX4 2wd)
Compression Ratio 11.0:1
 @ 5600 rpm, 

1.6 M16a  MPFI VVT (SX4 4wd)
Compression Ratio 11.0:1
 @ 5600 rpm, 

1.6 M16A MPFI VVT (SX4 S-Cross 2wd or 4wd)
Compression Ratio 11.0:1
Maximum output:  @ 6000 rpm
Maximum torque:  @ 4400 rpm

1.6 M16a MPFI VVT (Swift Sport 2005-2011)
Compression Ratio 11.1:1
 @ 6800 rpm,  @ 4800 rpm

1.6 M16a MPFI VVT (Swift Sport 2011 - 2014)
Compression Ratio 11.1:1
 @ 6900 rpm,  @ 4400 rpm
Redline: 7200 rpm

1.6 M16a (fourth generation Vitara 2015+)
 Compression ratio 11.0:1
 Max power:  @ 6,000 rpm
 Max torque:  @ 4,400 rpm

Application:
 Suzuki SX4 S-Cross 
 Suzuki Grand Vitara
 Fiat Sedici
 Suzuki Liana 
 Suzuki SX4 
 Suzuki Vitara LY

Suzuki Swift Sport
2nd generation 
3rd generation

M18A
The M18A is based on the previous M16a, with a larger bore. This engine has a variable valve timing valvetrain.

Due to the engine block being based on the same casting, a M16a cylinder head can be bolted onto a M18a shortblock with minor modifications. This has been done by tuners, by installing a M18a block with the stock internals (crank, pistons and rods) in a Suzuki Swift Sport, in order to have more torque on the whole rev band.

Application:
 Suzuki Aerio (Aust. & N.Z.)
Suzuki Liana GS 2004 (Australia & N.Z.) 
 2009-2012 Suzuki SX4 (China) 

Suzuki engines
Straight-four engines
Gasoline engines by model